is a retired Japanese baseball player for the Hanshin Tigers. He previously worked as a hitting coach for the Hanshin Tigers prior to the 2012 season. After the team failed to make the 2011 play-offs, team manager Akinobu Mayumi was fired, and Yutaka Wada was giving the position to replace him less than a week later. He is notable for various accomplishments, which include the following:
 1500 games played
 1500 hits
 24 game hitting streak from opening game (1997)
 3 straight seasons with playing every game
 Golden Glove (2nd baseman)
 All star player (1989, 1992–1996, 1999)

Career statistics

External links
 Hanshin Tigers website

1962 births
Living people
Nippon Professional Baseball infielders
Hanshin Tigers players
Baseball players at the 1984 Summer Olympics
Olympic baseball players of Japan
Olympic gold medalists for Japan
Managers of baseball teams in Japan
Hanshin Tigers managers
Medalists at the 1984 Summer Olympics
Baseball people from Chiba Prefecture